Evangelia Tzampazi (Ευαγγελία Τζαμπάζη) (born 5 October 1960 in Serres, Greece) is a Greek politician and Member of the European Parliament (MEP) for the Panhellenic Socialist Movement; part of the Party of European Socialists.

References

External links
 

1960 births
Living people
PASOK politicians
PASOK MEPs
MEPs for Greece 2004–2009
21st-century women MEPs for Greece
People from Serres